is the fifth live video album by Japanese band Wagakki Band, released on August 8, 2018 by Avex Trax in four editions: DVD, Blu-ray, and two Live CD editions. In addition, a mu-mo Shop exclusive release includes all editions and a poster. The video covers the band's concert at the Yokohama Arena on January 27, 2018.

The video peaked at No. 2 on Oricon's DVD chart and No. 13 on Oricon's Blu-ray chart.

Track listing
All tracks are arranged by Wagakki Band.

Personnel 
 Yuko Suzuhana – vocals
 Machiya – guitar, vocals ("Kyōshū no Sora")
 Beni Ninagawa – tsugaru shamisen
 Kiyoshi Ibukuro – koto
 Asa – bass
 Daisuke Kaminaga – shakuhachi
 Wasabi – drums
 Kurona – wadaiko

with

 Yo Hitoto – ("Dong Feng Po")

Charts

References

External links 
 
  (Avex Group)

Wagakki Band video albums
2018 live albums
Japanese-language live albums
Avex Group live albums
Avex Group video albums
Albums recorded at the Yokohama Arena